Chishti or Chishty is a toponymic surname (nisba) from Chisht in Afghanistan. It is used by people claiming ancestry from Moinuddin Chishti or association with his Chishti Order of Sufism.

Notable people 
 Abu Aḥmad Abdal Chishti, founder of the Chishti Order
 Abu Muḥammad Chishti, disciple of Abu Aḥmad Abdal Chishti
 Ata Hussain Fani Chishti, 19th-century Indian Sufi saint of Gaya, Bihar
 Bande Nawaz or Khwaja Syed Muhammad al-Hussaini Chishti, 14th and 15th-century Indian Sufi saint
 Dhruv Sangari or Bilal Chishty Sangari, Indian Sufi singer
 Fariduddin Ganjshakar or Shaik Fareeduddin Ganjshakar Chishti, 12th-century Sufi poet and mystic from Punjab
 Ghulam Ahmed Chishti, Pakistani music composer
 Islam Khan Chishti, Mughal governor of Bengal
 Karim Chishti, Indian cricketer
 Khwaja Abdullah Chishti, 16th-century Indian Sufi saint
 Maudood Chishti, Sufi saint of the Chishti Order
 Miya Khan Chishti, qadi of the Gujarat Sultanate in India, buried at Miya Khan Chishti's Mosque
 Mohammad Badshah Qadri or Syed Mohammad Badshah Qadri-ul-Chishti Yamani Raichuri, 20th-century Indian Sufi saint
 Mohammad Farooq Chishti, Indian politician
 Mu'in al-Din Chishti, most prominent Sufi saint and mystic of the Chishti Order
 Mukarram Khan Chishti, Mughal governor of Bengal
 Nasiruddin Chiragh Dehlavi or Khwaja Nasiruddin Mahmud Chishti, Indian Sufi saint of the Chishti Order from Delhi
 Qamar-ul-Zaman Faridi Chishti, Pakistani Sufi saint of the Chishti Order
 Qasim Khan Chishti, Mughal governor of Bengal, brother of Islam Khan
 Ṛta Kapur Chishti, Indian textile scholar and historian
 Rehman Chishti, UK Member of Parliament
 Salim Chishti, Sufi saint of the Chishti Order during the Mughal Empire in India
 Sardar Ahmad Chishti, Pakistani Sufi saint, jurist, author and debater
 S. R. Chishti, Indian musician
 Tajuddin Chishti, Sufi saint of Chishti Order in Chishtian, Punjab
 Unwan Chishti, Indian Urdu poet
 Waheed and Naveed Chishti, Pakistani qawwali singers and Quranic reciters
 Yousaf Saleem Chishti, Pakistani scholar and writer

References 

Surnames
Surnames of Afghan origin
Toponymic surnames
People from Chisht
Nisbas
Indian surnames
Surnames of Indian origin
Surnames of Pakistani origin
Arabic-language surnames
Urdu-language surnames